Stephen Hooper (born 9 May 1969) is a former Australian rules footballer who played 21 games for the Geelong in the Australian Football League. He was the number one draft pick of the 1990 AFL Draft. He made his debut on round 2 of the 1991 AFL season and played a total of 21 games in the 1991 and 1993 seasons.

External links

Australian rules footballers from Western Australia
Geelong Football Club players
East Perth Football Club players
1969 births
Living people
Place of birth missing (living people)